The Uni-President International Tower is a skyscraper located in Xinyi District, Taipei, Taiwan. It is the fifth tallest in Xinyi Special District(after Taipei 101, Taipei Nan Shan Plaza, Cathay Landmark and Farglory Financial Center). The height of building is 154.0 m, the floor area is 116,773.91m2, and it comprises 30 floors above ground, as well as 7 basement levels. It houses the Australian Office in Taipei, British Office Taipei, and Hong Kong Economic, Trade and Cultural Office. The lower level shopping mall is operated by Eslite (Eslite Xinyi).

See also 
 List of tallest buildings in Taiwan
 Xinyi Planning District

References

Office buildings completed in 2004
Skyscraper office buildings in Taipei
Xinyi Special District
2004 establishments in Taiwan